Stony Brook is a stream largely running through Lincoln and Weston, Massachusetts, then forming the Weston/Waltham boundary, and emptying into the Charles River across from the Waltham/Newton boundary.  It has two tributaries, Cherry Brook and Hobbs Brook, and its watershed includes about half of Lincoln and Weston as well as parts of Lexington and Waltham. Since 1887, it has been the water supply for Cambridge, along with the Hobbs Brook Reservoir.

History 
As early as 1662, water flowing into the Charles River helped spark business enterprise. Various water mills have been erected at the mouth of Stony Brook. A corn mill was built in January of 1679-80. A paper mill was built in about 1780 that was later purchased by the Boston Manufacturing Company in 1798 and converted into a cotton mill. In about 1802, another mill was built on Stony Brook to manufacture wrapping paper 

In the late 19th century, Eben Norton Horsford identified the mouth of Stony Brook as the location of a supposed Norse city, Norumbega, and commissioned the Norumbega Tower, which carries a long inscription describing the supposed city.

There are three large ponds, all artificial, in the Stony Brook watershed: the Cambridge Reservoir (Hobbs Pond), the Stony Brook Reservoir (Turtle Pond), and Flint's Pond (also known as Sandy Pond).

In 1887, on the site of Turtle Pond, the city of Cambridge completed construction of the Stony Brook Reservoir Dam, where Stony Brook joins the Charles, as part of its water supply. In 1910, Hobbs Pond was dammed to become the Cambridge Reservoir. Flint's Pond (also known as Sandy Pond) was dammed to become the reservoir for the town of Lincoln; the DeCordova Museum is on its southeast bank.

External links
 Map of Stony Brook watershed

See also
 Hobbs Brook Basin Gate House
 Stony Brook (Merrimack River)

References

Reservoirs in Massachusetts
Rivers of Middlesex County, Massachusetts
Weston, Massachusetts
Lakes of Middlesex County, Massachusetts